Jayne Marie Mansfield (born November 8, 1950) is an American actress and model. She is the first child and eldest daughter of 1950s Hollywood sex symbol and Playboy Playmate Jayne Mansfield and Mansfield's ex-husband Paul. Mansfield is also the elder half-sister of actress Mariska Hargitay. In July 1976, Mansfield became the first daughter of a Playmate to be a featured model in Playboy. To date, only one other daughter of a Playmate has been featured in the magazine. Additionally, Mansfield is the only model who was featured in 100 Beautiful Women along with her mother in the magazine's 1988 special issue. She has acted in the film Olly, Olly, Oxen Free (1978) and TV production Blond in Hollywood (2003).

Biography

Jayne Mansfield was born at St Paul’s University Hospital in Dallas,

Two weeks before her mother's death on June 29, 1967, Jayne Marie, then 16, claimed that she had been beaten by her mother's then-boyfriend, Sam Brody. Her statement to the Los Angeles Police Department the following morning implicated her mother in encouraging the abuse, and days later, a juvenile-court judge awarded temporary custody of Jayne Marie to a great-uncle, W.W. Pigue. Out of Jayne's five  children, only Jayne Marie attended her mother's funeral on July 3, 1967, because the other children were all under the age of 10.

In 1968, wrongful death lawsuits were filed on behalf of Jayne Marie and Matt Cimber, Jayne's husband from September 24, 1964, to July 11, 1965, and producer-director of her last film Single Room Furnished, the former for $4.8 million and the latter for $2.7 million.

In 1970, she married Barry Lang in Las Vegas, Nevada; the couple had one son but were later divorced. In March 1979, she declared her plan to write a biography of her mother.

As of 2008, Mansfield is in a long-term relationship and frequently visits her grandchildren.

Modeling
Mansfield is the first Playboy nude model whose mother was featured nude as well. Her 7-page pictorial in the magazine's July 1976 issue, titled Jayne's Girl, was photographed by Dwight Hooker. Hooker made the pictorial in a vintage Southern context, including monochromatic images. The accompanying text makes a comparison to her mother and the differences between the two, though Jayne Marie said in an interview that she is "not capitalizing on her bosom as (my) mother did" for the pictorial. In describing her, art historian Anthony W. Lee together with photographer Diane Arbus wrote, "Jayne Marie Mansfield has her mother's rounded features and mysterious eyes."

Filmography
 Olly, Olly, Oxen Free (1978): An independent film directed by Richard A. Colla that featured Katharine Hepburn and Kevin McKenzie in the lead. She was uncredited in cast list.
 Blond in Hollywood (season three): (TV production, 1 episode, February 2003): Third season of a documentary series on Hollywood sex symbols that also featured Matt Cimber and Miklós Hargitay, two of Jayne's husbands, as themselves.
 Jayne Mansfield: Loves and Kisses: Featured as an interview in the A&E documentary hosted by Peter Graves aired in 2006.

Footnotes and references

Sources

External links

1950 births
American film actresses
1970s Playboy Playmates
Living people
People from Bryn Mawr, Pennsylvania
Actresses from Pennsylvania
20th-century American actresses
Jayne Mansfield
American people of English descent
American people of German descent